Charles George Ammon, 1st Baron Ammon, PC, DL, JP (22 April 1873 – 2 April 1960) was a British Labour Party politician.

Background and education
The son of Charles George and Mary Ammon, he was educated at public elementary schools. He was active in the Independent Labour Party and was a conscientious objector in the First World War, becoming chief lobbyist at Parliament for the No-Conscription Fellowship.

Career
Ammon worked with the Post Office for twenty-four years.  He became active in the Fawcett Association, and was then secretary of the Union of Post Office Workers from 1920 to 1928.  He was also the first General Secretary of the National Union of Docks, Wharves and Shipping Staffs, and the Organising Secretary of the Civil Service Union.

Local politics
Ammon was London County Councillor for Camberwell North from 1919 to 1925 and from 1934 to 1946, and Chairman of London County Council from 1941 to 1942. He was an Alderman on Camberwell Borough Council from 1934 to 1953 and Mayor of Camberwell from 1950 to 1951. He received the Freedom of Borough of Camberwell in 1951.

Parliament
Ammon was Member of Parliament (MP) for Camberwell North 1922–1931 and 1935–1944, unsuccessfully contesting the seat in 1918 and 1931. He was Labour Party whip in 1923 and a member of the National Executive Committee of the Labour Party, 1921–1926. He served as Parliamentary Secretary to the Admiralty in 1924 and again in 1929-1931 and was a member of the West African Mission of 1938-1939 and of the Select Committee on National Expenditure, 1939–1944. He was temporary Chairman of Committees in 1943 and the same year served as Chairman of a Parliamentary Commission to investigate the future of the dominion of Newfoundland; the other members were A. P. Herbert and Derrick Gunston.

He was raised to the peerage as Baron Ammon, of Camberwell in the County of Surrey, in 1944 and appointed a Privy Counsellor in 1945. In the House of Lords he was Captain of the Gentlemen-at-Arms (Chief Whip) 1945–1949, and a Deputy Speaker of the House 1945–1958. In 1947 he was Chairman of a Parliamentary Mission to China. He was first Chairman of the National Dock Labour Board 1944–1950. His political career was effectively ended when he clashed with the government over the 1949 London dock strike.

Other public appointments
Outside Parliament, he was President of the UK Band of Hope Union and a Methodist Local Preacher. He was President of the International Arbitration League, vice-president of the Royal National Lifeboat Institution, a governor of the London School of Economics and Dulwich College and chairman of the trustees of Crystal Palace. He was a member of the Channel Islands Commission in 1947.

Personal life
Lord Ammon was predeceased by his only son Charles Kempley Ammon (1907–1909) and the peerage became extinct on his death in April 1960, aged 86.

References

External links

1873 births
1960 deaths
British conscientious objectors
Honourable Corps of Gentlemen at Arms
Labour Party (UK) MPs for English constituencies
Labour Party (UK) hereditary peers
British trade union leaders
Lords of the Admiralty
Members of London County Council
Members of the Privy Council of the United Kingdom
Ministers in the Attlee governments, 1945–1951
People from Camberwell
UK MPs 1918–1922
UK MPs 1922–1923
UK MPs 1923–1924
UK MPs 1924–1929
UK MPs 1929–1931
UK MPs 1935–1945
UK MPs who were granted peerages
Union of Communication Workers-sponsored MPs
Barons created by George VI